Laiza ( Laingza) is a remote mountainous town in the Kachin State, Myanmar. Laiza is the capital of the Kachin Independence Organisation since 2005.

History 
Laiza was just a village prior to 1994. It became an important town in Kachin State after the Kachin Independence Organization signed a ceasefire agreement with the State Peace and Development Council and moved its headquarters there from Pajau. Leaders representing different ethnic groups in Myanmar attended the Laiza Conference in October 2013, searching for common ground amongst ethnic groups and the Burmese government in preparation for further peace talks and the eventual creation of the Nationwide Ceasefire Agreement in 2015.

References 

Populated places in Kachin State
China–Myanmar border crossings